The East Siberian brown bear (Ursus arctos collaris) is a population or subspecies of brown bear which ranges from eastern Siberia, beginning at the Yenisei river, north to the Arctic Circle, as far as Trans-Baikaliya, the Stanovoy Range, the Lena River, Kolyma and generally throughout Yakutia and the Altai Mountains. The subspecies is also present in northern Mongolia.

Size 

East Siberian bears are intermediate in size to Eurasian brown bears and Kamchatka brown bears, though large individuals can attain the size of the latter. Their skulls are invariably larger than those of Eurasian brown bears and are apparently larger than those of Kamchatka brown bears. They have long, dense and soft fur which is similar in colour to that of Eurasian brown bears, though darker coloured individuals predominate.

Taxonomic history 

Originally, Cuvier's trinomial definition for this subspecies was limited to brown bear populations in the upper Yenisei river, in response to bears there sporting well-developed white collars. The subspecies has since been reclassified as encompassing populations formerly classed as jeniseensis and sibiricus, though the latter two lack the collar.

Behaviour and ecology 

Siberian bears tend to be much bolder toward humans than their shyer, more persecuted European counterparts. Siberian bears regularly destroy hunters' storages and huts where there is food. They are also more carnivorous than their European counterparts and do not seem to like honey. They hunt mountain hares and ungulates such as reindeer, wapiti or moose by ambushing them from pine trees.

References 

Eurasian brown bears
Carnivorans of Asia
Fauna of Siberia
Mammals described in 1824
Taxa named by Frédéric Cuvier